The 1921 San Diego State football team represented San Diego State Teachers College<ref  during the 1921 college football season. The team did not have a formal nickname in 1921. The "Professors" name was sometimes used, but local newspapers simply referred to the team either as "State" or the "Junior College".

1921 not only saw the first season of intercollegiate football for San Diego State, but it was also the first year San Diego State was a four-year institution. San Diego State competed in the Southern California Junior College Conference (SCJCC) from 1921 to 1924. The team was led by head coach Charles E. Peterson, and played home games at Balboa Stadium and at the College Field on campus. They finished the season with four wins and six losses (4–6, 1–3 SCJCC). The team scored 60 points in their ten games while giving up 100.

Schedule

Notes

References

San Diego State
San Diego State Aztecs football seasons
San Diego State Professors football